Alena Sergeyevna Andreeva (born 21 November 1997) is a Russian footballer who plays as a forward and has appeared for the Russia women's national team.

Career
Andreeva has been capped for the Russia national team, appearing for the team during the 2019 FIFA Women's World Cup qualifying cycle.

International goals

References

External links
 
 
 

1997 births
Living people
Russian women's footballers
Russia women's international footballers
Women's association football forwards
CSP Izmailovo players
FC Chertanovo Moscow (women) players
21st-century Russian women